A delusion is a belief held with strong conviction despite superior evidence to the contrary.

Delusion may also refer to:

Films 
 Delusion (1955 film), a Danish crime film drama directed by Johan Jacobsen
 Delusion (1980 film), an American horror film directed by Alan Beattie
 Delusion (1991 film), an American crime thriller film directed by Carl Colpaert
 Delusion (1998 film), a Croatian crime-drama film directed by Zeljko Senecic
 Delusions (film), a 2005 Israeli comedy-drama film directed by Nimrod Etsion Koren
 Delusional (2014 film), an American thriller film starring Perry King and Tuesday Knight
 Delusion (2016 film), a Chinese-Hong Kong suspense thriller film directed by Danny Pang Phat

Music 
 Delusions (To-Mera album), 2006
 Delusions (First Choice album), 1977
 "Delusional" (song), a 2010 single by American singer-songwriter Simon Curtis

Other uses 
 Delusion (spirituality), in Buddhism or Eastern spirituality, fundamental misunderstanding of the nature of reality
 Delusion, treasures of incredible power usually given to Fatui Harbingers in the game Genshin Impact

See also